In enzymology, a glutamine-scyllo-inositol transaminase is an enzyme that catalyzes the chemical reaction

L-glutamine + 2,4,6/3,5-pentahydroxycyclohexanone  2-oxoglutaramate + 1-amino-1-deoxy-scyllo-inositol

Thus, the two substrates of this enzyme are L-glutamine and 2,4,6/3,5-pentahydroxycyclohexanone, whereas its two products are 2-oxoglutaramate and 1-amino-1-deoxy-scyllo-inositol.

This enzyme belongs to the family of transferases, specifically the transaminases, which transfer nitrogenous groups.  The systematic name of this enzyme class is L-glutamine:2,4,6/3,5-pentahydroxycyclohexanone aminotransferase. Other names in common use include glutamine scyllo-inosose aminotransferase, L-glutamine-keto-scyllo-inositol aminotransferase, glutamine-scyllo-inosose transaminase, and L-glutamine-scyllo-inosose transaminase.  It employs one cofactor, pyridoxal phosphate.

References

 

EC 2.6.1
Pyridoxal phosphate enzymes
Enzymes of unknown structure